NA-212 Mirpur Khas-I is a constituency for the National Assembly of Pakistan.

Members of Parliament

2018-2022: NA-218 Mirpur Khas-I

Election 2002 

General elections were held on 10 Oct 2002. Pir Aftab Hussain Shah Jilani of PPP won by 63,638 votes.

Election 2008 

General elections were held on 18 Feb 2008. Pir Aftab Hussain Shah Jilani of PPP won by 78,543 votes.

Election 2013 

General elections were held on 11 May 2013. Pir Shafqat Hussain Shah Jilani of PPP won by 82,017 votes and became the  member of National Assembly.

Election 2018 

General elections were held on 25 July 2018.

See also
NA-211 Sanghar-III
NA-213 Mirpur Khas-II

References

External links 
Election result's official website

NA-226